Lužan is a village in Croatia with a population of 719 as of 2011.

Populated places in the City of Zagreb